The Department of Energy is the department of the South African government responsible for energy policy. It was established in 2009 when the former Department of Minerals and Energy was divided into the Department of Energy and the Department of Mineral Resources.

From 2012 to 2014, the Minister of Energy was Ben Martins and his deputy was Barbara Thompson. Tina Joemat-Pettersson MP had been the Minister of Energy. She was previously the Minister of Agriculture, Forestry, and Fisheries from 2009 to 2014. After Tine Joemat-Petterson was asked to leave, Mmamoloko Kubayi-Ngubane was appointed. This only lasted 7 months before the next reshuffle and the appointment of David Mahlobo. His appointment was potentially linked to securing the planned Russian nuclear deal - a country he had just visited as Minister of State Security.link

President Cyril Ramaphosa appointed Jeff Radebe as Minister as part of his cabinet reshuffle on 26 January 2018.

In the 2016/2017 budget the department had a budget of R7,545 million and a staff complement of 622 civil servants.

In August 2018, the Department of Energy released a draft of South Africa's updated Integrated Resource Plan (IRP), the plan which seeks to meet the country's energy consumption demands, for public comment. The current plan dropped proposals for expansion of the number of nuclear plants in the country, focusing instead on expanding the production of renewable energy and creating two new coal power plants.

References

External links
 Official website

Energy
South Africa
Energy in South Africa
Energy